Doug Wheatley, sometimes credited as Douglas H. Wheatley or Doug Tropea-Wheatley, is a Canadian comic book artist who has illustrated numerous comic books including several Star Wars and How to Train Your Dragon stories for Dark Horse Comics. He also illustrated the book Fire & Blood, written by George R. R. Martin.

References

External links
 DarkWater: The Art of Doug Wheatley
 Interview: An Interview with Douglas Wheatley at www.rebelscum.com
 Interview: Artist Profile: Doug Wheatley of Star Wars: Dark Times at thefablerblog.com

Canadian comics artists
Year of birth missing (living people)
Living people